The Hum Award for Best Drama Serial or Hum Award for Best Drama Serial Jury is one of the Hum Awards of Merit presented annually since the awards debuted in 2013, by the Hum Television Network and Entertainment Channel (HTNEC) to production company of their producers working in the television industry and is the only category in which every member is eligible to nominate for. Best Drama Serial is considered the most important of the Hum Awards, as it represents all the directing, acting, music, writing, and other efforts put forth into a drama. Consequently, Best Drama is the third last final award besides Best Actor and Actress and the conclusion of the annual Hum Awards ceremony. As of 3rd Hum Awards, there have been 22 dramas nominated for the Best Drama Serial award. This category is the equivalent to the Hum Award for Best Drama Serial - Popular, decide by public voting.

History

Category name and changes 
The best drama category originates with the 1st Hum Awards ceremony since 2013. This category has been given to the best drama of previous year to the ceremony held. Since Hum Awards has been just started, this category has not a brief history. The name of the category officially termed by the channel is:

 2012 to 2013: Hum Award for Best Drama Serial
 2014 to present: Hum Award for Best Drama Serial Jury

From second year ceremony the drama serial was categorized into two different categories, one being awarded by the jury's decision and other being awarded by public voting. Though drama serial was being awarded on jury decision and Hum membership, the official acknowledgment was developed in second year ceremony.

Recipients
Originally the producers were presented the award until first ceremony (2012), where all credited producers were able to receive the award. But as of second year ceremony (2013) the award is presented to production company and is usually received by the owner of the production and those who share screen credits with the production company. , all recipients are eligible for the award if they meet the following conditions.
those with screen credit of "producer" or "produced by" or "production"
those three or fewer producers who have performed the major portion of the producing functions

For the first time three producers was nominated at 3rd Hum Awards for drama serial Sadqay Tumhare under production company MD Productions for Momina Duraid and two individuals Samina Humayun Saeed and Tariq Ahmed Shah who independently served as executive producers.

Best Drama Serial and Best Director
The Hum Awards for Best Drama Serial and Best Director Drama Serial have been very closely linked throughout their inception. Of the 22 drama serials that have been nominated for Best Drama Serial, 21 have also nominated for Best Director Drama Serial. Only Zindagi Gulzar Hai won both Best Director and Best Drama award, at 2nd Hum Awards in 2014. Only Shehr-e-Zaat and Bunty I Love You won the Best Drama Serials awards for their producers without winning Directing awards. Presently only four drama serials have nominated for Best Director without their producers being nominated: Sanjha, Durr-e-Shahwar, Mata-e-Jaan Hai Tu and Bilqees Kaur, while Sanjha is the only serial who won Best Director award without being nominated as Best Drama Serial. Drama Serial Mausam and Ahista Ahista are the only serials that alternatively received Best Drama and Best Director nominations respectively.

Due to the inception of Hum Award for Best Drama Serial - Popular, two drama serials Zindagi Gulzar Hai and Sadqay Tumhare have won both Directing and Drama Serial Popular award.

Winners and nominees 
In the list below, winners are listed first in the colored row, followed by the other nominees. The year shown is the one in which the drama serial first telecast; normally this is also the year before the ceremony at which the award is given; for example, a drama serial exhibited telecast during 2005 then this will be eligible for consideration for the 2005 Best Drama Serial Hum Awards, awarded in 2006. The number of the ceremony (1st, 2nd, etc.) appears in parentheses after the awards year, linked to the article on that ceremony. Each individual entry shows the title followed by the production company, and the producer. From Second ceremony, the Best Drama Serial Viewers Choice award has given to Production company rather than to producer. But received by the Producer who owns that company.

For the first ceremony, the eligibility period spanned full calendar years. For example, the 1st Hum Awards presented on April 28, 2013, to recognized dramas that were released between January, 2012, and December, 2012, the period of eligibility is the full previous calendar year from January 1 to December 31. However this rule was subjected to change when two (Sadqay Tumhare and Digest Writer) of nominated drama serial were still airing when nominations were announced.

Date and the award ceremony shows that the 2010 is the period from 2010-2020 (10 years-decade), while the year above winners and nominees shows that the dramas year in which they were telecast, and the figure in bracket shows the ceremony number, for example; an award ceremony is held for the dramas of its previous year.

2010s

References

External links 
Official websites
 
 Hum Television Network and Entertainment Channel (HTNEC)
 Hum's Channel at YouTube (run by the Hum Television Network and Entertainment Channel)
 Hum Awards at Facebook (run by the Hum Television Network and Entertainment Channel)]

Hum Award winners
Hum Awards